The Russian Customs Tariff is the customs duty for the Russian Federation.

See also
Customs Code of Russia
Federal Customs Service of Russia

External links
Russian Customs Tariff
Russian Import Duties
Russian Taxes
Russian Harmonized System (HS Code)
HS (Harmonized System) Codes

Law of Russia
Legal codes
Taxation in Russia
Customs duties
Foreign trade of Russia